Monroe Street School, also known as  J.C. Price High School and S.E. Duncan Education Center of Livingstone College, is a historic school building located at Salisbury, Rowan County, North Carolina.  It was built in 1923, and is a three-story, Classical Revival style red brick building. It was damaged by fire in 1941 and rebuilt.  A cafeteria addition was completed in 1960.  The school originally served as Salisbury's only African-American public school.  It was originally named J. C. Price High School, but the name was changed in 1931 with the construction of another school given that name.

It was listed on the National Register of Historic Places in 2003.

References

Historically segregated African-American schools in North Carolina
School buildings on the National Register of Historic Places in North Carolina
Neoclassical architecture in North Carolina
School buildings completed in 1923
Schools in Rowan County, North Carolina
National Register of Historic Places in Rowan County, North Carolina
1923 establishments in North Carolina
Livingstone College